Melas Chasma  is a canyon on Mars, the widest segment of the Valles Marineris canyon system, located east of Ius Chasma at 9.8°S, 283.6°E in Coprates quadrangle. It cuts through layered deposits that are thought to be sediments from an old lake that resulted from runoff of the valley networks to the west. Other theories include windblown sediment deposits and volcanic ash. Support for abundant, past water in Melas Chasma is the discovery by MRO of hydrated sulfates. In addition, sulfate and iron oxides were found by the same satellite. Although not chosen as one of the finalists, it was one of eight potential landing sites for the Mars 2020 rover, a mission with a focus on astrobiology.

The floor of Melas Chasma is about 70% younger massive material that is thought to be volcanic ash whipped up by the wind into eolian features. It also contains rough floor material from the erosion of the canyon walls. Around the edges of Melas is also much slide material.

In a recent study of southwestern Melas Chasma using high-resolution image, topographic and spectral datasets eleven fan-shaped landforms were found. These fans add to growing evidence that Melas Chasma once held a lake that had fluctuating levels.

Using HiRISE images, CTX images, and DEM's, a team of researchers mapped many channels and inverted channels in Melas Chasma. A digital elevation model (DEM) is a digital model or 3D representation of a terrain's surface. In addition, they found dendritic networks of channels in the plateaus just above the Chasma.  Channels appeared to have formed at different times, hence there were "wet-dry" phases in the history of Melas Chasma. The whole region may have had liquid water for extended periods in the early Hesperian.

See also

 Chasma
 Coprates quadrangle
 Digital elevation model
 Geology of Mars
 HiRISE
 Inverted relief
 Lakes on Mars

References

External links
 
   Lakes on Mars - Nathalie Cabrol (SETI Talks)

Valleys and canyons on Mars
Coprates quadrangle
Mars 2020